The following is a list of Britpop musicians. While definitions may vary, artists labelled as Britpop were typically guitar-based bands that emerged from the British music scene, were popular in the 1990s, and focused more on melody than other contemporary genres such as grunge.

Artists

References

Lists of rock musicians by subgenre
 
Lists of British musicians by genre